Kvitsvodene Valley is an ice-filled valley about  long between Kvitkjølen Ridge and the Robin Heights in the Sverdrup Mountains of Queen Maud Land, Antarctica. It was photographed from the air by the Third German Antarctic Expedition (1938–39). The valley was mapped and named by Norwegian cartographers from surveys and air photos by the Norwegian–British–Swedish Antarctic Expedition (NBSAE) (1949–52) and air photos by the Norwegian expedition (1958–59).

References

Valleys of Queen Maud Land
Princess Martha Coast